A syllable is a unit of organization for a sequence of speech sounds.

Syllable may also refer to:

 Syllable (computing), a unit of information storage
 Syllable (operating system), an operating system based on AtheOS

See also
 Semi-syllable (disambiguation)
 Syllabic (disambiguation)
 Syllabary, a set of written symbols
 Slab (unit), a unit of information storage consisting of 12 bits
 Instruction syllable, the portion of a machine language instruction that specifies the operation to be performed